Karolína Plíšková was the defending champion, but lost in the quarterfinals to Aryna Sabalenka.

Caroline Wozniacki won the title, defeating Sabalenka in the final 7–5, 7–6(7–5). Wozniacki won the title after saving a match point Angelique Kerber had against her in the semifinals.

Seeds
All seeds received a bye into the second round.

Draw

Finals

Top half

Section 1

Section 2

Bottom half

Section 3

Section 4

Qualifying
The top three seeds received a bye into the qualifying competition.

Seeds

Qualifiers

Lucky loser
  Sachia Vickery

Draw

First qualifier

Second qualifier

Third qualifier

Fourth qualifier

Fifth qualifier

Sixth qualifier

References
Main draw
Qualifying draw

2018 WTA Tour
2018 Women's Singles